Van de Velde,  Vande Velde, or Vandevelde is a Dutch toponymic surname meaning "from the field".  Van de Velde is the 32nd most common name in Belgium, with 8,903 people in 2008, while in 2007 there were 3,319 people named "Van de Velde" in The Netherlands. Among other variations on this name are Van der Velde, Vandevelde, Van Velde, Van de Velden, and Van der Velden.

Artists
Peter van de Velde (1503-1586), Flemish painter born Pieter de Kempeneer and a.k.a. Pedro Campaña (each: "Peter of the Field")
Esaias van de Velde (1587-1630), Dutch landscape painter
Jan van de Velde the Elder or I, Dutch engraver 
Jan van de Velde II (1593-1641), Dutch engraver and painter; son of Jan I, cousin of Esias
Jan Jansz van de Velde III (1620-1662), Dutch still life painter; son of the above
Jan van de Velde IV, printmaker 
Willem van de Velde, the elder (c. 1611-1693), Dutch seascape painter; no relation to the above
Willem van de Velde, the younger (1633-1707), Dutch marine painter; son of Willem the Elder
Adriaen van de Velde (1636-1672), Dutch animal and landscape painter; son of Willem the Elder
Peter van de Velde (1634 – after 1723), Flemish marine painter
Charles William Meredith van de Velde (1818-1898), Dutch Lieutenant-at-sea and painter
Henry van de Velde (1863-1957), Belgian painter, architect and interior designer

Others
 Abraham Momber van de Velde (fl. 1705-1710), last Dutch governor of Mauritius
 Bruce Van De Velde, American sports administrator
 Chris VandeVelde (b. 1987), American ice hockey player
 Christian Vande Velde (b. 1976), American cyclist, son of John Vande Velde
 Darryl Van de Velde, (b. 1951), Australian rugby league footballer, coach and administrator. 
 James van de Velde, former Yale University lecturer and a figure in the 1998 Suzanne Jovin case
 James Oliver Van de Velde (1795–1855), Roman Catholic Bishop of Chicago
 Jean van de Velde (b. 1957), Dutch film director, father of Yannick van de Velde
 Jean van de Velde (b. 1966), French golfer
 John Vande Velde (b. 1950), American cyclist
 Philippe Vandevelde (b. 1957), Belgian comics writer
 Roger van de Velde (1925-1970), Belgian writer
 Theodoor Hendrik van de Velde (1873-1937), Dutch physician and gynæcologist
 Vivian Vande Velde (b. 1951), American author
 Wannes Van de Velde (1937-2008), Flemish singer and poet
 Yannick van de Velde (b. 1989), Dutch actor, son of Jean van de Velde (director)

See also
 Van de Velde N.V., Belgian lingerie company

References

Dutch-language surnames
Dutch toponymic surnames